AP-5 complex subunit zeta (AP5Z1) is a protein that in humans is encoded by the AP5Z1 gene.

Function 

The protein encoded by this gene is one of two large subunits of the AP5 adaptor complex. Damaging variants in this gene are associated with SPG48, a type of hereditary spastic paraplegia.

References